Jennifer "JJ" Jareau is a fictional character from the CBS crime drama Criminal Minds, portrayed by A. J. Cook.

Character background 
Jareau was born November 22, 1981. During various episodes, Jareau has described growing up in East Allegheny, Pennsylvania, a small town near Pittsburgh. When she was 11, her 17-year-old sister Rosalyn killed herself. Rosalyn's death is a particularly painful subject for her, and she initially chose not to tell her young son about her sister, until her mother Sandy (Candy Clark) reminds her that avoidance is not the solution to dealing with the pain.

A high school athlete and scholar, Jareau graduated valedictorian from East Allegheny High School, where she was the captain of the varsity soccer team her senior year and earned an athletic scholarship to the University of Pittsburgh. She also attended Georgetown, presumably for graduate studies.

Jareau decided to join the FBI after attending a book reading by BAU founder and then-Unit Chief Agent David Rossi (Joe Mantegna). She once told Rossi that she had not known what to do with her life until she listened to his reading, which was held in the campus bookstore during her senior year in college. The next fall, she applied to the FBI Academy.

Storylines  
In the FBI's Behavioral Analysis Unit (BAU), Jareau acts as the team's liaison with the media and local police agencies. Though she is skilled in analyzing criminal behavior, she is not actually a profiler, having once declined Unit Chief Aaron Hotchner's (Thomas Gibson) suggestion to take the necessary classes in behavioral science.

She works mostly out of the confines of the police stations and field offices the team visits. However, she does accompany the team on raids, and is proficient with firearms. This is made particularly clear when she resolves a hostage situation inside the BAU by killing the hostage-taker, serial killer Jason Clark Battle (Bailey Chase), with a single shot.

During season six, she is promoted to the Pentagon. She returns in season seven as a full-time profiler, having received the necessary training. In season 9 ("200"), she is kidnapped, and it is revealed that her year as the DOD Liaison at the Pentagon was a cover story; it turns out she was part of a task force in Afghanistan, in search of Osama bin Laden. The team rescues her, but she suffers from post-traumatic stress disorder as a result of the torture she suffered at the hands of her captors. She begins working through it with help from her friend and fellow agent Spencer Reid (Matthew Gray Gubler). During her recovery, she reveals that she had suffered a miscarriage while in Afghanistan, and admits that her unresolved grief for her child is feeding into her PTSD.

Promotion to Pentagon and brief return 
It is revealed in the episode "JJ," that Jareau had twice rejected a promotion to The Pentagon and hid the offers from her superiors. However, she is finally forced to transfer by Section Chief Erin Strauss (Jayne Atkinson). Jareau was written out of the show after Cook was let go at the beginning of season six, for financial reasons relating to the premiere of the spin-off Criminal Minds: Suspect Behavior. Jareau's time at the Pentagon is explored in depth in season nine.

Cook later returned following the departure of Paget Brewster, who portrayed Agent Emily Prentiss. In the episode titled "Lauren," Jareau receives a call and returns to help the BAU find Prentiss and capture terrorist Ian Doyle (Timothy V. Murphy), who has been trying to kill her. The episode ends with Prentiss presumed dead after being stabbed by Doyle. It is later revealed that Prentiss is alive and in Paris with Jareau's help, providing her passports from three different countries and a bank account in each "to keep her comfortable." In the season six finale, Jareau returns in order to tell Rossi that she is "coming back".

In "200," it was revealed that Jareau's transfer was a cover story and that she was actually put on a task force in the Middle East with fellow agent (and future Section Chief following Strauss' death) Mateo Cruz (Esai Morales). During this time, she witnessed a mission she had pushed for fail and discovered one of the task force's informants dead. In February 2011, while overseas, she discovered that she was pregnant. However, in April 2011, following the events of "Lauren," during an attack on the task force, she was wounded and miscarried the baby. She didn't initially tell her husband, Will LaMontagne, Jr. (Josh Stewart), of the pregnancy, and it remained a secret between her and Cruz. In "The Forever People," when she starts showing signs of PTSD, Reid calls her on it, and he tries to help her and talk to her. She eventually admits she had a miscarriage due to the attack on her convoy, and asks him to keep it between them.

Return to the BAU 
The season seven premiere reveals that Jareau has returned to the Behavioral Analysis Unit, having received the training to become a full-time profiler, instead of the Media Liaison, a position which has been split between Hotchner and technical analyst Penelope Garcia (Kirsten Vangsness).

She is initially against summoning Prentiss "back from the dead," but Hotchner insists on telling the team the truth. Reid, who had cried on her shoulder for 10 weeks believing that Prentiss was dead, is hurt by her deception, and takes awhile to forgive her and resume their friendship.

In season nine, the events during her departure in 2010–11 are referenced after Cruz is promoted to Section Chief. In "The Road Home," while waiting to meet Cruz, she is suddenly kidnapped. In "200," it is revealed that she was kidnapped by Tivon Askari (Faran Tahir), a former member of the task force who had secretly been working for terrorists, in order to access files from her mission in the Middle East. She was held hostage alongside Cruz and tortured into giving up the code. She discovered that Askari was not working alone when he mentioned her miscarriage, revealing the true mastermind to be Michael Hastings (Tahmoh Penikett), another traitor from the task force. He threatens to rape Jareau in order to get Cruz to give up his access code. She is rescued by Hotchner and Prentiss, and she proceeds to chase after Hastings. Prentiss accompanies her and they both take on Hastings, resulting in Hastings falling off a roof to his death.

A year after her kidnapping and torture, she starts experiencing PTSD, something that Reid notices. When he confronts her, she asks him to provide a term to describe her situation, saying that it is more than PTSD. She breaks down and reveals her ordeal in Afghanistan and her miscarriage to Reid. She later behaves recklessly during a hostage situation with a suspect in a room with a gas leak, which could have gotten her, the suspect, and his hostage killed. She then hallucinates that Askari is in the room with her, taunting her that he wants to watch her kill herself. He also tells her that he will take her sleep, her smile, and her safety away, as well as change her so that her husband and son will no longer recognize her.

Relationships and family 
Jareau is married to Will LaMontagne, Jr. They have two sons, Henry and Michael. As of season 13, she and Matt Simmons (Daniel Henney) are the only members of the BAU who are married with children.

Prior to meeting LaMontagne, Jareau displays little interest in dating. She once goes on a date with Reid to a Washington NFL home game, but little came of it romantically, although the two became very good friends. In the season 2 episode "Jones," Jareau first meets LaMontagne, a New Orleans Police Department detective whom the team worked with while in New Orleans after a serial killer presumed to have been killed during Hurricane Katrina resurfaces. It is revealed the following season, in the episode "In Heat," that he and Jareau had been seeing each other for a year, but tried to keep the relationship a secret for her colleagues. Jareau says she wanted to keep her personal and professional lives separate, which LaMontagne initially misunderstands as her being ashamed of him. When she finally reveals their relationship by kissing him goodbye after the team solves a case in Miami, it is apparent that her colleagues had known about their relationship the whole time.

In "The Crossing," Jareau tells LaMontagne that she is pregnant with his child. He later asks her to marry him, and indicates that he is willing to give up his career in order to help take care of the baby and allow Jareau to continue to do her job, though he is worried about her safety and the safety of their child. She later told Hotchner she has found a temporary replacement for the duration of her maternity leave, and soon after gives birth to a baby boy named Henry. LaMontagne transfers to the MPDC, and the family live together in Washington. In later seasons, toddler Henry is portrayed by Cook's real-life son Mekhai Andersen. Jareau and LaMontagne name Reid and Garcia as Henry's godparents. When Jareau returns from maternity leave, she and LaMontagne have exchanged rings with Henry's birthstone, but do not seem to be officially engaged, as she wears her ring on her right hand, not the left. In the season seven finale, Jareau asks LaMontagne to propose to her again, and they marry the following evening in a small ceremony in Rossi's backyard.

In "Truth or Dare", the Season 14 finale, Jareau tells Reid that she has loved him ever since they first met. Despite insisting that she only said it to distract a killer holding them hostage, Reid knows that she was telling the truth, but chooses not to dwell on it for the sake of their friendship. Season 15 opens up "Under the Skin" with Jareau being shot and clinging to life. At the hospital Reid admits to a sleeping Jareau that it does not matter if she loves him or not, as he cannot imagine life without her. After she wakes up, she tells Reid that she meant what she said, and that he will always be her first true love. Nevertheless, the two decide to keep their relationship platonic.

Characterization 
Jareau is very loyal to and protective of her family and friends, particularly Reid, with whom she has a close, sibling-like friendship. She is also known to be a crack shot. This was demonstrated in many episodes such as "Nanny Dearest" by shooting a fleeing suspect in the head at a faraway distance. In "Penelope," she kills Jason Clark Battle, a serial killer who is holding a hostage in the BAU office, by sneaking up behind him and shooting him directly between the eyes when he turns around. Despite her petite frame, she is very athletic and has shown herself to be able to hold her own even if disarmed. In the season 7 finale, she manages to physically fight off a stronger and taller suspect who tries to kill LaMontagne and kidnap Henry.

Fears and obsessions 
In "The Boogeyman," Jareau reveals that she is afraid of the woods.

When she and Reid unexpectedly run into serial killer Tobias Hankel (James Van Der Beek) in the episode "The Big Game," and split up to apprehend the suspect, she walked into a dark barn and is attacked by Hankel's dogs in which she is almosted mauled by them before she shoots and kills the dogs to save her own life, but Hankel uses the distraction to kidnap Reid, later torturing and almost killing him before the BAU team are able to rescue him. After this traumatic experience, Jareau develops a fear of dogs.

She also seems to have a fondness for Cheetos. She can be seen eating them often, and it was implied that her online Scrabble handle was "Cheeto-breath" when she was playing Prentiss (who was hiding in Paris at the time).

In "Mr. Scratch," Jareau tells Hotchner that her worst fear as a child was being separated from her parents.

References

External links 

Criminal Minds characters
Fictional Federal Bureau of Investigation personnel
Fictional characters from Pittsburgh
Television characters introduced in 2005
American female characters in television
Fictional victims of sexual assault
Fictional characters with post-traumatic stress disorder